Samuel Shellabarger (December 10, 1817 – August 6, 1896) was an American lawyer and politician who served three different stints as a Republican U.S. Representative from Ohio in the mid-19th century.

Biography
Born near Enon, Ohio, Shellabarger attended the county schools and was graduated from Miami University, Oxford, Ohio, in 1841. He studied law and was admitted to the bar, commencing practice in Springfield, Ohio, in 1846. He served as a member of the State house of representatives in 1852 and 1853.

Shellabarger was elected as a Republican to the Thirty-seventh Congress (March 4, 1861 – March 3, 1863). He was an unsuccessful candidate for reelection in 1862 to the Thirty-eighth Congress. Shellabarger was elected to the Thirty-ninth and Fortieth Congresses (March 4, 1865 – March 3, 1869). He declined to be a candidate for renomination in 1868. He served as U.S. Minister to Portugal from April 21 to December 31, 1869.

Shellabarger was again elected to the Forty-second Congress (March 4, 1871 – March 3, 1873). During that term he served as chairman of the Committee on Commerce. Perhaps the most historically memorable moment of his life came early in this term when he drafted an anti-Ku Klux Klan bill—sometimes referred to as the Civil Rights Act of 1871.  After passage by both houses of Congress, the bill was signed into law by President Ulysses S. Grant on April 20.  This bill was very instrumental in giving Grant the tools he needed to demolish the first-era KKK. Shellabarger's KKK bill was the second introduced in Congress that year; an earlier bill drafted by Benjamin Butler had failed to garner sufficient votes for passage.

Shellabarger was not a candidate for renomination in 1872. He served as a member of the United States Civil Service Commission in 1874 and 1875. Shellabarger continued the practice of law until his death in Washington, D.C., August 6, 1896. He was interred in Ferncliff Cemetery, Springfield, Ohio.

Through his son Robert and daughter-in-law Elizabeth, he is the grandfather of Samuel Shellabarger (1888–1954), who after the death of both Robert and Elizabeth in 1889, was raised in the elder Shellabarger household, later becoming an American educator and author of note.

References

Source for initial material

External links
 
 

1817 births
1896 deaths
Miami University alumni
Politicians from Springfield, Ohio
Republican Party members of the Ohio House of Representatives
Ambassadors of the United States to Portugal
19th-century American diplomats
19th-century American politicians
People from Clark County, Ohio
Republican Party members of the United States House of Representatives from Ohio